George Herbert LaFrance III (born September 24, 1965) is a former Arena Football League offensive specialist. In a playing career lasting twelve years, he played for the Detroit Drive (1988-1993), the Tampa Bay Storm (1994-1999), and the New Jersey Red Dogs (2000). In 2002, he served as general manager of the San Diego Riptide.

Career 
LaFrance attended Baker University in Baldwin City, Kansas, where he played as a wide receiver for two years.

LaFrance is in the AFL Hall Of Fame, and in ArenaBowl IX, wearing #25 for the Storm, became the only player to ever win ArenaBowl MVP 3 times. LaFrance is the career leader in Tampa Bay Storm all-purpose yards with over 20,000.

Retirement 
In 2012, the 47-year-old LaFrance cited his desire to return to the AFL after 12 seasons of retirement. LaFrance stated, "You can always think. I'm in good shape. It would be during the playoffs. What team I'm looking at, I don't know. A team that's ready. I'll keep that wide open."

LaFrance is currently athletic director at Navajo Technical University in Crownpoint, New Mexico.

References

External links
ArenaFan Online's George LaFrance page

1965 births
Living people
Sportspeople from New Orleans
People from New Iberia, Louisiana
Players of American football from New Orleans
American football wide receivers
Detroit Drive players
Tampa Bay Storm players
New Jersey Red Dogs players
Baker Wildcats football players